() is a Flemish municipality of Belgium, much of which consists of a number of small Belgian enclaves fully surrounded by the Netherlands.

, it has a population of 2,935.

Geography

Border with 

These distributions were ratified and clarified as a part of the border settlements agreed under the Treaty of Maastricht in 1843. The tight integration of the European Union and in particular the Schengen Agreement have made many of the practicalities of the situation substantially simpler since the 1990s.

In total, it consists of 24 separate parcels of land. In addition to this, there are twenty Belgian exclaves fully within the Netherlands and three other sections straddling the contiguous Dutch-Belgian border. There are also seven Dutch enclaves within the Belgian exclaves (i.e., counter-exclaves) that are part of the territory of the Netherlands. Six of these Dutch enclaves are located within the largest Belgian exclave, and a seventh in the second-largest Belgian exclave. An eighth Dutch exclave is located near .

During the First World War, this situation meant that the Imperial German Army could not occupy these parts of Belgium without crossing the Netherlands, which the Dutch government did not allow. Thus, these pieces of Belgium became a place where refugees could safely stay. A clandestine radio transmitter was smuggled in and from there worked with the Belgian resistance. The Dutch government fenced off these areas and controlled access in or out of them, building a church and school for the Belgian people who were effectively stranded within the enclaves.  This situation did not exist in the Second World War, as both countries were occupied by Nazi Germany.

Some houses in the town of / are divided between the two countries. At one time, according to Dutch laws, restaurants had to close earlier. For some restaurants on the border, this simply meant that the customers had to move to a table on the Belgian side. In 2020, restrictions due to the COVID-19 pandemic differed between the two countries; for instance, preventing a Belgian citizen living metres away from an open Dutch bar from patronising it.

Two villages in the municipality, Zondereigen and Ginhoven, are located in the main territory of Belgium.

List of enclaves

Netherlands enclaves
These are all part of  municipality.

Belgian enclaves
These are all part of  municipality, and are surrounded by  municipality (Netherlands).

Climate

Education
 has two elementary schools: De Vlinder and De Horizon.

Notable inhabitants
 Petrus Christus, 15th century painter

See also
 , an exclave of Germany surrounded by Switzerland
 , an exclave of Italy surrounded by Switzerland
 , an exclave of Spain surrounded by France
 India–Bangladesh enclaves, 173 former enclaves (not including counter-enclaves)
 The City & The City, a novel about two fictional co-existing city states.

References

External links

Official Web site Baarle-Hertog 
Official Web site Baarle-Nassau 
The Baarle Enclaves outlined with Maps
Open Topo Arcgis map
Barry Smith's Baarle Site (with maps)
Photos from Baarle-Nassau/Hertog
Jan S. Krogh's Geosite about the Baarles
Photograph of H-22, the smallest enclave of B.-Hertog at 51°26'54"N 4°50'10"E
New York Times, Frugal Traveler Blog, August 2008 (Matt Gross) – see video of Baarle-Hartog in middle of page
'En Territoire Belge et a quarante centimetres de la frontiere' - English-language PhD thesis on the historical geography of Baarle's enclaves, including photos and detailed maps

 
Belgium–Netherlands border crossings
Enclaves and exclaves
Municipalities of Antwerp Province
Twin cities